Bonnie and Terry Turner are an American husband-and-wife team of screenwriters and producers. They are best known for creating the sitcoms 3rd Rock from the Sun,  That '70s Show, and its Netflix sequel That '90s Show.

From 1986 until 1992, the team were staff writers for Saturday Night Live.

Between 1987 and 1995, they were responsible for writing or screenwriting six films, including Coneheads, Wayne's World, Wayne's World 2, Tommy Boy, and The Brady Bunch Movie.

History
Bonnie and Terry were part of a 1980s Atlanta comedy troupe whose members often appeared on the  WTBS comedy TV show Tush. Bonnie and Terry also worked as feature writers for (no relation) Ted Turner's new (at that time) CNN spinoff CNN Headline News. In the mid 1980s, they produced the WTBS Sunday morning magazine show Good News with host Liz Wickersham.

Another comedy troupe member and good friend, Jan Hooks, after appearing in Pee-wee's Big Adventure, landed a spot on Saturday Night Live. Occasionally, Bonnie and Terry submitted comedy material for Jan (and via Jan) to Lorne Michaels. In 1986, Michaels convinced Bonnie and Terry to leave their lives in Atlanta and come to work in New York as full-time writers on SNL.

References

External links

1940s births
Living people
American television writers
Screenwriting duos
Married couples
Place of birth missing (living people)
Kent State University alumni
American screenwriters
Primetime Emmy Award winners